Xeromphalina cirris is a species of agaric fungus in the family Mycenaceae. Described as new to science in 1988, it is known from montane or boreal coniferous forests floors in British Columbia, Ontario, Colorado, Idaho, New Mexico, Oregon, Utah, Washington, and Wyoming.

References

External links

Fungi described in 1988
Fungi of North America
Mycenaceae